Tepoxalin, marketed under the brand name Zubrin among many others, is a non-steroidal anti-flammatory drug (NSAIDs) generally used in veterinary medicine to reduce swelling in animals with osteoarthritis. In rare circumstances, Tepoxalin can also be used in human pharmacology to relieve pain caused by musculoskeletal conditions such as arthritis and hip dysplasia.

In 1997, the drug was patented for veterinary use, replacing isoxazole for treating inflammation. In 2017, the drug was withdrawn from the American market and can no longer be administered in the United States.

Tepoxalin (C20H20ClN3O3) has been synthesized by several methods. There are many perspectives on whether the consumption of Tepoxalin on its own is more effective than combining it with antihistamines, but when applied in veterinary medicine, Tepoxalin is regularly administered with antihistamines.

Approval 

The Committee for Medicinal Products for Veterinary Use (CVMP) approved Tepoxalin as a drug for animals to reduce inflammation and control pain. Additionally, in Europe, Tepoxalin was approved by the EU Community Register of Medicinal Products and European Medicines Agency in the product categories of Veterinary Drug and Veterinary Pharmacotherapeutic Group categorised into the Musculo-skeletal System subcategory.

Tepoxalin was first medically approved in the United States in 1998. The drug was taken off the market in 2017 and cannot be administered in the United States. However, it still has Food and Drug Administration (FDA) approval.

On the 4 September 2017, an application was submitted to the European Medicines Agency (EMEA) asking for an extension of marketing authorisation for Tepoxalin. The EMEA criticised the quality, safety and efficacy data submitted and the application was declined.

Pharmacology and biochemistry 
Tepoxalin (C20H20ClN3O3) has been synthesized by several methods.  

The drug works as a nonsteroidal anti-inflammatory drug (NSAID).  It inhibits both cyclooxygenase (COX-2) and lipoxygenase (5-LOX) enzymes suppressing biosynthesis of prostaglandins and leukotrienes, respectively.  . 

Tepoxalin is marketed as white, flavourless tablets that rapidly disintegrate when consumed by an animal. These tasteless tablets are branded as Zubrin on the market. After consumption, Zubrin has a half-life of 120 minutes in the plasma, whereas the entire metabolite has a half-life of 13 hours. It is therefore usually prescribed to be taken once a day.

Canine and feline uses 
Available in an oral formulation, Tepoxalin is used to treat osteoarthritis in canine and feline species. The use of Tepoxalin was more effective than the NSAID (nonsteroidal anti-flammatory drug), carprofen when administered in canines. As a result, the usage of carprofen was replaced with Tepoxalin in 1998.

Tepoxalin can only be administered to dogs that weigh  or larger at a dose of 10–20 mg/kg at a daily schedule. The approximate duration of complete treatment is at most 14 days. If treated for a prolonged period of time (more than 180 days), it may result in gastrointestinal irritation and gastric ulceration. The plasma concentration of Tepoxalin when administered varies between every dog.  Since Tepoxalin has a low water solubility and a high fat solubility, it is often prescribed to fed canines rather than fasted as this is more effective for Tepoxalin.

In felines, Tepoxalin has an inhibitory action on COX-1 and 5-LOX enzymes. For felines, Tepoxalin is prescribed in doses between 5 and 10 mg/kg once daily for 3 consecutive days.
When Tepoxalin is administered in cats, a drunken-like state afflicting the central nervous system has been recorded on rare occasions.

Equine use 
When administered to horses, the formulation can be a paste, powder or feed-in form which can be fed orally or it can be injected intravenously but no other place in the equine body, as it can cause tissue damage. However, if Tepoxalin is injected repeatedly in the vein for a prolonged period of time, it can also cause tissue damage and edema (trapped fluid in tissue).

Chronic inflammatory diseases are the most common diseases in horses. Phenylbutazone was formerly used as treatment, but when administered to horses at high doses, it can cause ulcers of the glandular stomach, oral cavity and colon. Due to the major adverse effects of phenylbutazone, the replacement by Tepoxalin was made to reduce muscular pain in 2003.

In horses, the drug is intravenously administered at 10 mg/kg on a daily dose for 10 days. Doses may be doubled or tripled to treat severe pain, such as laminitis. The plasma (cytoplasm; the main part of the capsule) half-life of Tepoxalin is 4–8 hours, although the entire metabolite half-life is 24 hours, so single dosing is efficient for horses. When given at reasonable doses, the drug is non-toxic even when used repeatedly.

Adverse effects 
There is a high incidence of adverse reports received for Tepoxalin by the Centre of Veterinary Medicine. Common side effects of the consumption of Tepoxalin include vomiting, diarrhoea, blood in faeces, loss of appetite, fatigue, thirst, an increase in urination and behavioural changes. In older and sensitive animals, loss of hair and abrasion of the skin may occur. The drug cannot be used by animals during breeding, pregnancy or lactation as the drug can affect the foetus or infants. In animals with a history of internal bleeding or low blood pressure, it can result in perforation of the stomach walls or intestinal mucosa.

Older dogs are more prone to the adverse effects. When administered to male canines, there are no effects to fertility. However, when a female canine is treated during the organogenetic period, it may result in embryo foetal toxicity. The outcome of this toxicity is a major reduction in foetal weight, incomplete formation of various bones and other skeletal malformations. In extreme cases,  it can result in the death of the foetus.

Overdose can occur if administered in an excessive large dose. Signs of overdose or toxicity in canines and felines include tremors, seizures, abnormal behaviour, vomiting and weakness.

References 

Dog medications
Pyrazoles
Hydroxamic acids
Nonsteroidal anti-inflammatory drugs
Phenol ethers
Chlorobenzenes
Cat medications